Ɲ is a letter indicating a palatal nasal. The lowercase form ɲ is used as an IPA symbol. The upper and lower case are used in the orthographies of some African languages (e.g. Bambara and Fula in Mali).

Its Unicode code points are U+019D and U+0272, respectively.

Usage
The lowercase form  is used as an IPA symbol for the voiced palatal nasal.

The symbol  is used to represent an alveolo-palatal nasal in some languages, since there is no IPA symbol with the latter meaning, and no language distinguishes the two.

Usage on Computers

References

See also
Ñ

NN
NN